The church of San Giovanni Evangelista is a 15th-century religious building in the San Polo sestiere of the Italian city of Venice. It stands across a courtyard from the Scuola Grande di San Giovanni Evangelista.

History

Construction on the church has taken place in three phases, the first in 1425.  Reconstruction has taken place in 1645 and again recently to repair earthquake damage. 

San Giovanni Evangelista was historically decorated by a series of frescoes, depicting both biblical and classical themes.  Some art from San Giovanni has been removed for display at international museums or scholarly research.

Description

Tourism

It is located on the Calle del Magazzen close to the Scuola Grande di San Rocco. The church accepts visitors between Monday to Friday 9.30am to 12.30pm.

References

Religious buildings and structures completed in 1425
Roman Catholic churches completed in 1425
Giovanni
Giovanni Evangelista, Venice